The Snake Bay Patrol was an auxiliary reconnaissance unit made up of Indigenous Australian residents of Melville Island in the Northern Territory that was raised by the Royal Australian Navy during World War II. After the first bombing raid on Darwin in 1942, special units consisting of Indigenous Australians were formed, one of which was the Snake Bay Patrol. The Snake Bay Patrol unit was established by Royal Australian Naval Volunteer Reserve officer Lieutenant J.W.B. Gribble during the Pacific War to detect any Japanese forces which landed on the island, with local Indigenous Australians being informally recruited and never formally enlisted into the military. The Patrol's 35 members served on a full-time basis, received firearms training, were issued naval uniforms and held naval ranks conferred by Gribble, but were not paid. Similar units were raised on Bathurst Island, the Cox Peninsula and Groote Eylandt.

During the war the Snake Bay Patrol conducted patrols along the shore of Melville Island, rescued downed Allied airmen and determined the location of naval mines. Two members of the Patrol are also believed to have formed part of reconnaissance parties landed on Timor from Allied submarines. 

The former members of the Snake Island Patrol only became eligible for service medals and payments in recognition of their service in 1962. In December 1991 the few surviving members of the Patrol and the other auxiliary Indigenous units received compensation for not having been paid during the war, as well as the Defence Medal and War Medal; these were also provided to the next of kin of the members who had died by that time. The next year the surviving men became eligible for veteran's benefits under the Veterans’ Entitlements Act 1986.

See also
Northern Territory Special Reconnaissance Unit
Torres Strait Light Infantry Battalion

References

History of Indigenous Australians
Indigenous Australians in the Northern Territory
Military units and formations of Australia in World War II
Military units and formations of the Royal Australian Navy
Indigenous Australians in the military
1940s in the Northern Territory